Carl Axel Johan Gadolin (14 November 1898 – 21 October 1972) was a Finnish doctor of philosophy and a writer in Swedish. He also used the pseudonyms Alexander Gaditz and Kristian Ulfsby. 

Gadolin was born in Espoo to professor Alexander Gadolin and Signe Adéle von Alfthan. He graduated in 1916 with a master’s degree in philosophy in 1920 and a licentiate and doctorate in 1937. He married Ingrid Mary Anita Stackelberg on 30 July 1924, with whom he had three children: Bo Wolter Alexander, Ingegerd Rubia Anitra, and Innet Iza Helena.

Gadolin was the secretary of the Turku Chamber of Commerce from 1924 to 1940, the director of the Turku Stock Exchange from 1924 to 1940, an associate professor at Åbo Akademi University from 1938 and the General Counsel of the Central Chamber of Commerce in 1940 and 1941. Gadolin was a member of the trade delegation in Germany and England in 1929, in Russia in 1934 and in Latvia in 1938. He was head of the German delegation to the Central Chamber of Commerce in 1940.

Gadolin wrote numerous anti-Semitic writings and denied the Holocaust in his writings.

Works
 ; C. A. J. Gadolin and Eric v. Born. Söderströms, Helsinki 1913
 ; C. A. J. Gadolin and Eric v. Born. C. W. K. Gleerup, Lund 1922
 . Turku 1924 (special edition Uusi Aura)
 . Turku 1924 (special edition Uusi Aura)
 . Publications of the Turku Chamber of Commerce 16. Turku Chamber of Commerce, Turku 1924 (Finnish: . Turun kauppakamarin julkaisemia kirjasia no. 16. Turun kauppakamari, Turku 1924)
 . Suomen veronmaksajayhdistyksen paikallisosasto, Turku 1924
 . Turku 1925
 . Helsinki 1931 (special edition Kauppalehti)
 . Söderströms, Helsinki 1932
 . Åbo 1934 (Finnish: . Turku 1934)
 . Ekonomiska samfundet, Helsinki 1935
 , doctoral thesis. Publications of the Ekonomiska samfundet i Finland 2. Schildts, Helsinki 1936
 . Turku 1936
 . Turku 1937
 : Part 1 includes articles by Herman Gummerus and Carl Axel Johan Gadolin. Nya Dagligt Allehandas författartävling 1. Wahlström & Widstrand, Stockholm 1937
 . Kooperativa förbundets bokförlag, Stockholm 1938, 2nd revised edition 1940
 . Helsinki 1939 (special edition Kauppalehti no. 59, 11 March 1939)
 . Kieler Vorträge 60. Gustav Fischer, Jena 1939
 . Nya Argus 1/1939
 . Författaren, Helsinki 1940 (Finnish: . Akateeminen kirjakauppa, Helsinki 1940)
 . Vår nya värld 11. Dagens böcker, Malmö 1941
 . Helsinki 1942
 . Det nya Europa 1. Dagens böcker, Malmö 1942
 . Carl Röhrig, Munich 1943
 . Författaren, Turku 1943
 . Penningvärdets förlag, Kalmar 1948
 . . Penningvärdets förlag, Kalmar 1948 
 . Akademiska bokhandeln, Helsinki 1950
 . Mitteilungen aus dem Institut für Raumforschung Bonn 15. Institut für Raumforschung, Bad Godesberg 1952
 The solution of the Karelian refugee problem in Finland; with a preface by G. H. L. Zeegers. Publications of the Research Group for European Migration Problems 5. Martinus Nijhoff, The Hague 1952
 . Helsinki 1957 
 ; foto Harriet Percy. Saxon & Lindström, Stockholm 1967
As Alexander Gaditz:
 . Carlos, Åbo - Fahlcrantz & Gumaelius, Stockholm 1946 
As Kristian Ulfsby :
 . H. Åbergs bokförlag i distribution, Stockholm 1946

References 

Finnish writers in Swedish
Holocaust deniers
1898 births
1972 deaths
Finnish fascists
People from Espoo
Antisemitism in Finland